Malene Jørgensen (born 30 July 1986) is a Danish professional golfer who played on the Ladies European Tour between 2009 and 2016. She was runner-up in the Dutch Ladies Open, Turkish Ladies Open and Hero Women's Indian Open.

Early life and amateur career
Jørgensen started playing golf at age 9 with her family, encouraged by her 6 years older brother Michael Jørgensen, a professional golfer and Challenge Tour player. She represented Odense Eventyr Golf Club.

Jørgensen was a member of the Danish National Team between 2002 and 2008. She represented Denmark at the 2008 European Ladies' Team Championship where Denmark finished fifth and at the 2008 Espirito Santo Trophy in Adelaide, Australia, where Denmark tied for 8th place.

Professional career
Jørgensen turned professional in January 2009 and joined the Ladies European Tour. In her rookie year, she finished inside the top 80 in the rankings, to keep her full card. She finished 48th on the Order of Merit in 2010 and 56th in 2011, but had to return to Q-School to keep her card after finishing 100th in 2012. 

She represented Denmark at the 2011 European Nations Cup with Iben Tinning, replacing Lisa Holm Sørensen.

Jørgensen's game improved, and in 2013 she made the cut at the Women's British Open. In May 2014, she hit the best form of her career, and was runner-up at the Turkish Airlines Ladies Open, and the following week lost a playoff to Kylie Henry at the Deloitte Ladies Open. In 2015, she finished third at the Helsingborg Open and Lacoste Ladies Open de France, and recorded another runner-up finish at the Hero Women's Indian Open, losing by one stroke to compatriot Emily Kristine Pedersen. 

She finished 15th on the LET Order of Merit in 2014, 16th in 2015, and 18th in 2016. After taking 2017 off for maternity leave, Jørgensen did not return to tour.

Amateur wins
2006 Danish Amateur Strokeplay Championship, Danish Amateur Matchplay Championship
2008 Danish Amateur Strokeplay Championship, Danish International Ladies Amateur Championship

Source:

Playoff record
LET playoff record (0–1)

Results in LPGA majors

CUT = missed the half-way cut
"T" = tied

Team appearances
Amateur
European Ladies' Team Championship (representing Denmark): 2008
Espirito Santo Trophy (representing Denmark): 2008

Professional
European Nations Cup (representing Denmark): 2011

References

External links

Danish female golfers
Ladies European Tour golfers
Sportspeople from Odense 
1986 births
Living people